Tyszkiewicz Palace or Tiškevičiai Palace can refer to several palaces of Tyszkiewicz family.

Places named Tyszkiewicz Palace or "former Tyszkiewicz Palace" and other historically owned properties of the family are located in Warsaw and Kraków, and in numerous towns of modern Poland, Belarus, Lithuania (in Palanga, Kretinga, Lahojsk, Raudondvaris, Berdychiv, Biržai, Kavarskas, Deltuva, Trakai, Lentvaris, Seredžius, and Ukraine. 

Particular ones include:
Tiškevičiai (Tyszkiewicz) Palace, Palanga
Tyszkiewicz Palace, Warsaw
TTiškevičiai (Tyszkiewicz) Palace, Biržai and Astravas Manor